Timothy Shawn Fortugno (born April 11, 1962) is a former Major League Baseball pitcher and current scout, working for the New York Mets as of November 2015.

Career
He graduated in 1980 from Uxbridge High School (Uxbridge, Massachusetts). Fortugno is an alumnus of Golden West College and Vanguard University of Southern California.

Fortugno signed with the Seattle Mariners as an amateur free agent in 1986. He was traded along with Phil Bradley from the Mariners to the Philadelphia Phillies for Glenn Wilson, Mike Jackson and Dave Brundage at the Winter Meetings on December 9, 1987. He made his major league debut at the age of 30 with the California Angels on July 20, 1992, and appear in his final game on July 26, 1995. His last year in professional baseball was in 1998. He played until he was 36 years old, ultimately, venturing into scouting.

Primarily a relief pitcher during his professional career (1986–1997), his first major league win came in his second start. On July 25, 1992, Fortugno hurled a three-hit shutout against the Detroit Tigers, striking out 12.

Fortugno's career totals include 76 games pitched (5 starts), 110.1 innings, a 3–4 record with one save, and an ERA of 5.06.  Fortugno was the pitcher who yielded the 3,000th hit of future Hall of Fame member George Brett on September 30, 1992. Shortly after giving up the hit, he picked Brett off at first base.

References

External links

Pura Pelota (Venezuelan Winter League)

1962 births
Living people
American expatriate baseball players in Canada
Baseball players from Massachusetts
Bellingham Mariners players
Beloit Brewers players
California Angels players
Chattanooga Lookouts players
Chicago White Sox players
Cincinnati Reds players
Clearwater Phillies players
Denver Zephyrs players
Edmonton Trappers players
El Paso Diablos players
Golden West Rustlers baseball players
Indianapolis Indians players
Major League Baseball pitchers
New York Mets scouts
Ottawa Lynx players
People from Clinton, Massachusetts
People from Uxbridge, Massachusetts
Reading Phillies players
Reno Silver Sox players
Salinas Spurs players
Scranton/Wilkes-Barre Red Barons players
Sportspeople from Worcester County, Massachusetts
Stockton Ports players
Texas Rangers scouts
Tiburones de La Guaira players
American expatriate baseball players in Venezuela
Vancouver Canadians players
Vanguard Lions baseball players
Vanguard University alumni
Wausau Timbers players
American expatriate baseball players in Taiwan
Sinon Bulls players